Callopistria duplicans is a moth of the family Noctuidae. It is found in Japan, Korea, China and Taiwan.

The wingspan is about 28 mm.

References

Moths described in 1858
Caradrinini
Moths of Asia